DXXL (93.9 FM), broadcasting as 93.9 iFM, is a radio station owned and operated by the Radio Mindanao Network. The station's studio is located at the 2/F San Vicente Bldg., Iñigo St. cor. Bonifacio St., Davao City, and its transmitter is located along Broadcast Ave., Shrine Hills, Matina, Davao City.

History
Established in 1977, DXXL was RMN's fourth FM station in Mindanao for soft launch. A year later, the station began operations as 93.9 XL-FM, carrying a CHR/Top 40 with the slogan "The Pride and Joy of Davao City". At that time, its original studio and transmitter were located along Shrine Hills, Matina. During the 80s, it was among the top-rated stations in the city, along with DXSS and DXBM. On August 16, 1992, the station was relaunched as Smile Radio 93.9 XL-FM with a mass-based format. On November 23, 1999, it rebranded as 939 XLFM and switched back to a CHR/Top 40 format, with its slogan "Live it Up!". On May 16, 2002, the station was rebranded as 93.9 iFM and went back to a mass-based format.

References

Radio stations in Davao City
DXXL